Viva Las Vegas is a 1964 American musical film directed by George Sidney and starring Elvis Presley and Ann-Margret. The film is regarded by fans and film critics as one of Presley's best films, and it is noted for the on-screen chemistry between Presley and Ann-Margret. It also presents a strong set of ten musical song-and-dance scenes choreographed by David Winters and features his dancers. Viva Las Vegas was a hit at film theaters, as it was #14 on the Variety year end box office list of the top-grossing films of 1964.

Plot
Lucky Jackson (Elvis) goes to Las Vegas, Nevada to participate in the city's first annual Grand Prix Race. However, his race car, an Elva Mark VI Maserati, is in need of a new engine in order to compete in the event.

Lucky raises the necessary money in Las Vegas, but he loses it when he is shoved into the pool by the hotel's young swimming instructor, Rusty Martin (Ann-Margret). Lucky then has to work as a waiter at the hotel to replace the lost money to pay his hotel bill, as well as enter the hotel's talent contest in hopes of winning a cash prize sizable enough to pay for his car's engine.

During all this time, Lucky attempts to win the affections of Rusty.  His main competition arrives in the form of Count Elmo Mancini (Cesare Danova) and his Ferrari 250 GT Berlinetta. Mancini attempts to win both the Grand Prix and the affections of Rusty. Rusty soon falls in love with Lucky, and immediately tries to change him into what she wants.

Cast

Production
George Sidney later said "that was one of those cases where we had no script and we had a commitment. Originally it was something about an Arabian or something... But we turned it around and we wrote the script in about eleven days... We changed the whole thing and decided to do it in Las Vegas."

In March 1963 MGM president Robert O'Brien announced Viva Las Vegas starring Elvis would be one of 20 made at the studio the following year. By May, Ann-Margret signed to co-star. She was paid $15,000 a week over ten weeks. Viva Las Vegas was filmed during the summer of 1963, before production of Presley's film Kissin' Cousins, but was released after Kissin' Cousins in the summer of 1964.

In Great Britain, both the film and its soundtrack were sold as Love In Las Vegas, since there was another, different film called Viva Las Vegas that was being shown in British cinemas at the same time that Presley's was released.

The chemistry between the two stars was genuine during filming. Presley and Ann-Margret began an affair, and this received considerable attention from film and music gossip columnists. This reportedly led to a showdown with Presley's worried girlfriend Priscilla Beaulieu. (Elvis and Priscilla married in 1967.) In her 1985 book Elvis and Me, Priscilla Presley describes the difficulties that she experienced when the gossip columnists erroneously "announced" that Ann-Margret and Presley had become engaged to be married.

In her memoirs, Ann-Margret refers to Elvis Presley as her "soulmate" and stated: "We felt there was a need in 'The Industry' for a female Elvis Presley."

In addition, the filming of Viva Las Vegas reportedly produced unusually heated exchanges between the director, film veteran George Sidney,  and Presley's manager, Colonel Tom Parker, who was not credited as a "Technical Advisor" in the film's credits.

The arguments reportedly concerned the amount of time and effort allotted by the  cinematographer, Joseph Biroc, to the song and dance numbers that featured Ann-Margret, ostensibly on the orders of the director. These scenes include views of Ann-Margret's dancing taken from many different camera angles, the use of multiple cameras for each scene, and several retakes of each of her song-and-dance scenes.

David Winters from the original cast of West Side Story was the film's choreographer and was recommended by Ann-Margret for the job. This was Winters' first job as a choreographer on a feature film and Ann-Margret was his dance student at the time. Because the film went over budget, Parker would slash budgets for all remaining films in Presley's career.

Little Church of the West, the oldest wedding chapel in Las Vegas, is the location used in the closing scene.

The scene where Presley sings "Viva Las Vegas" is performed in one single unedited shot; the only known example of such a technique in Presley's film career.

The film also includes a scene (Lucky and the Count looking for Rusty) with the showgirls of the Folies Bergere at The Tropicana Hotel Las Vegas.

Reception

Box Office
The film grossed $9,442,967 at the box office, earning $5 million in U.S. theatrical rentals.

Critical
For his role in Viva Las Vegas, Elvis Presley received a third place prize 1965 Laurel Award for best male performance in a musical film. Viva Las Vegas also received the 1965 Laurel Award for runner-up in the category of the best musical of 1964. Ann-Margret was praised for her on screen chemistry with Elvis, as she nearly stole the film from him.

Some critics in 1964 were lukewarm about Viva Las Vegas, such as one for The New York Times, who wrote: "Viva Las Vegas, the new Elvis Presley vehicle, is about as pleasant and unimportant as a banana split." However, many others deduced the reasons why many members of the North American public liked the movie so much. Variety stated in its review: "Beyond several flashy musical numbers, a glamorous locale, and one electrifying auto race sequence, the production is a pretty trite and 'heavyhanded' affair". Critical reaction notwithstanding, Viva Las Vegas has become one of Elvis Presley's most popular and iconic films.

Contemporary reception for the film has been positive. On review aggregator Rotten Tomatoes, the film holds an approval rating of 87% based on 30 reviews. The site's critics consensus reads, "Ann-Margret keeps Elvis on his toes and together they elevate Viva Las Vegas into a naughty and rockin' mild delight." Filmink argued Ann-Margret "had so much energy and pep that she had blown her previous three male co-stars off screen, but Elvis could match her. He was the best on-screen partner she ever had, and she was his. It’s the most purely entertaining Elvis movie ever, a complete delight and it’s unbelievable they were never teamed again."

The film is recognized by American Film Institute in these lists:
 2004: AFI's 100 Years...100 Songs:
 "Viva Las Vegas" – Nominated
 2006: AFI's Greatest Movie Musicals – Nominated

Soundtrack

Home media
 Warner Home Video, August 1, 2000.
This DVD release contains the movie in two formats on a flipper disc. One side contains the movie in the Aspect Ratio: 1.33:1 (4:3), the other side is in Widescreen (Letterbox). The soundtrack is presented in mono.

 Viva Las Vegas Deluxe Edition, Warner Home Video, August 7, 2007.
 Commentary by Steve Pond, rock journalist and author of Elvis in Hollywood
 Restored and Digitally Remastered in a 16x9 master, enhanced for widescreen televisions. Color/16x9 Anamorphic transfer 2.4:1
 New featurette Kingdom: Elvis in Vegas
 Remastered soundtrack in Dolby Digital 5.1 from original production elements and original mono theatrical soundtrack.

This film is the first of only two Elvis movies (the other being Jailhouse Rock) to be officially released onto every home media format distributed in the U.S. (Beta, VHS, CED Disc, Laserdisc, DVD, HD DVD and Blu-ray Disc)

In popular culture
 The iconic classic racer anime character Gō Mifune (aka Speed Racer), and his racer image, complete with neckerchief and black pompadour, was directly based on Elvis's character in this movie.
 In the 1998 movie The Big Lebowski, the song "Viva Las Vegas" is playing as the Big Lebowski's wife, Bunny, returns home.
 The 2000 film The Flintstones in Viva Rock Vegas is a play on the title of this film. Ann-Margret also appears in the movie and performs a version of "Viva Las Vegas" for the soundtrack, but retitled "Viva Rock Vegas".
 In Angel, the fourth season episode "The House Always Wins" highlights the song when Angel, Gunn and Fred drive to Vegas to visit (and eventually rescue) their friend Lorne, who is an unwilling performer in a mystical lounge act.
 Elvis, a 2005 TV miniseries about the life of Elvis Presley, depicts the supposed Elvis/Ann-Margret affair during the filming of Viva Las Vegas.
 The suit Elvis Presley wears in the movie is depicted in Fallout: New Vegas (2010), worn by an Elvis impersonator who goes by the moniker "The King".
 Viva, also known as Viva Las Vegas, is an AIDS Services of Austin fundraiser that traditionally features faux gambling. In 2009, the event began featuring a fashion show, labeled by Austin American-Statesman social columnist Michael Barnes as the "Best Austin fashion show ever."

See also
 List of American films of 1964
 List of films set in Las Vegas

References

Sources

Further reading

External links
 
 
 
 
 Entry at movie cars database
 Interview with Ann-Margret

1964 films
1964 musical comedy films
1964 romantic comedy films
American musical comedy films
American romantic comedy films
American romantic musical films
American auto racing films
Films directed by George Sidney
Films scored by Georgie Stoll
Films set in the Las Vegas Valley
Films shot in the Las Vegas Valley
Metro-Goldwyn-Mayer films
1960s English-language films
1960s American films